Sabbir Khan Shafin (born January 30, 1978 in Dhaka) is a Bangladeshi cricketer who plays first-class cricket for Chittagong Division. He is a right-arm offbreak bowler and handy lower-order batsman. Sabbir has made two first-class centuries to date and has taken over 200 wickets.

External links
 
 

1978 births
Living people
21st-century Bangladeshi cricketers
Chittagong Division cricketers
Cricketers from Dhaka